Guillermo Arenas Milán is a Spanish basketball coach. Currently he is the Head Coach for Alimerka Oviedo Baloncesto (LEB Oro).

Coaching career 
He began his coaching stint with Unión Financiera Asturiana Oviedo Baloncesto back in 2011, serving as the assistant head coach for the team. After a year, in 2012, after spending his first season as assistant coach for the Unión Financiera Asturiana Oviedo Baloncesto, he was duly promoted to be the head coach of the team.

On 2017, he signed with the team, Levitec Huesca. But in May 2020, he left the said team.

On 2021, he signed with Círculo Gijón Baloncesto y Conocimiento to become an assistant coach.

Head Coaching Record 

|-
| align="left" |Unión Financiera Baloncesto Oviedo
| align="left" |2012-13
|20||15||5||.7500 || align="center"|
|-
| align="left" |Unión Financiera Baloncesto Oviedo
| align="left" |2013-14
|26||14||12||.5387 || align="center"|
|-
| align="left" |Unión Financiera Baloncesto Oviedo
| align="left" |2014-15
|28||11||17||.3929 || align="center"|
|-
| align="left" |Levitec Huesca
| align="left" |2016-17
|14||7||7||.5000 || align="center"|
|-
| align="left" |Levitec Huesca
| align="left" |2017-18
|34||13||21||.3824 || align="center"|
|-
| align="left" |Levitec Huesca
| align="left" |2018-19
|34||18||16||.5294 || align="center"|
|-
| align="left" |Levitec Huesca
| align="left" |2019-20
|24||9||15||.3750 || align="center"|
|-
|-class="sortbottom"
| align="center" colspan=2|Career||206|||97|||109||.4709||

References

External links
 Guillermo Arenas coaching profile at EuroBasket.com

Living people
1977 births
Spanish basketball coaches